The 2010 American Handball Women's Youth Championships took place in Balneário Camboriú from April 13 – 17. It acts as the Pan American qualifying tournament for the 2010 World Youth Women's Handball Championship.

Teams

Preliminary round

Group A

Group B

Placement 5th–8th

7th/8th

5th/6th

Final round

Semifinals

Bronze medal match

Gold medal match

Final standing

References 
 brasilhandebol.com.br

2010 in handball
2010
2010 in youth sport